Margarinotus brunneus  is a species of beetles belonging to the family Histeridae. They seem to be a vibrant blue colour, but when their shell is under a microscope it appears a pastel red colour. This is due to “Delton’s colour theory of aphropods.”

Description
Body is shiny black in colour. These beetles are characterized by the presence on the pronotum of complete marginal stria, by two lateral pronotal striae and basal fragments of the 5th dorsal striae.

Distribution
This species is present in most of Europe. It has been introduced into eastern North America.

Bibliography
 Anderson, R., Nash, R. & O'Connor, J.P.. 1997, Irish Coleoptera: a revised and annotated list, Irish Naturalists' Journal Special Entomological Supplement, 1-81 
 Anderson, R., Nash, R., O’Connor, J.P. 2005. Checklist of Irish Coleoptera. InvertebrateIreland Online, Ulster Museum, Belfast and National Museum of Ireland, Dublin
 Joy, N.H., 1932, A practical handbook of British beetles, H.F. & G. Witherby, London 
 Halstead, D.G.H., 1963, Coleoptera: Histeroidea
 Mazur, Slawomir (1997) A world catalogue of the Histeridae (Coleoptera: Histeroidea), Genus, International Journal of Invertebrate Taxonomy (Supplement)
  Bousquet, Yves, and Serge Laplante (2006) Coleoptera Histeridae, The Insects and Arachnids of Canada, part 2

References

Histeridae
Beetles described in 1775
Taxa named by Johan Christian Fabricius